Beyo (Spanish: Bello ) is one of 18 parish (administrative division)  in Aller, a municipality within the province and autonomous community of Asturias, in northern Spain. 

Villages and hamlets
 Ferguerúa
 Maravidí
 Pando
 Riarría
 Vaḷḷina

References 

Parishes in Aller